The 2007 Supercheap Auto Bathurst 1000 was an endurance race for V8 Supercars, held on 7 October 2007 at the Mount Panorama Circuit near Bathurst in New South Wales, Australia. It was the tenth round of the 2007 V8 Supercar Championship Series.

The race was the eleventh running of the Australian 1000, first held in 1997 following an organisational split that occurred with the Bathurst 1000 in that year. It was the 50th race in the combined history of the Bathurst 1000 and the Australian 1000.

Entry list
31 cars were entered in the race – 15 Holden Commodores and 16 Ford Falcons. Four drivers would make their Bathurst 500/1000 debuts - Jay Verdnik, Andrew Thompson, Shane van Gisbergen and David Reynolds. Van Gisbergen would become the third youngest starter in the races' history at 17 years, 4 months and 28 days old.

A series of drivers would also make their last entries in 2007 - Simon Wills, Damien White, Christian Murchison, Cameron McLean and John Bowe, whilst it would also be the last starts for Paul Weel and Paul Radisich - despite both entering the 2008 race. The aforementioned Verdnik would make his only start in 2007.

Practice
Free practice was held over three sessions on Thursday, 4 October and Friday, 5 October 2007.

Qualifying 
Qualifying was held in two stages on Friday, 5 October 2007. The opening part of the session decided grid positions 21 to 31, with the twenty fastest cars progressing to the second leg of qualifying which decided grid positions 11 to 20. The fastest ten cars progress through to the traditional Top Ten Shootout, held the following day to decide grid positions 1 to 10. During the first leg of qualifying, Damien White crashed the Team BOC #14 Falcon, sustaining a concussion and sufficient damage to the car to put White and co-driver Christian Murchison out of the race.

After qualifying three cars, the #22 Holden Racing Team Commodore of Glenn Seton and Nathan Pretty, the #20 Supercheap Auto Racing Commodore of Paul Dumbrell and Paul Weel and the #55 Autobarn Racing Commodore of Steve Owen and Tony D'Alberto were excluded from qualifying after changing engines twice when under the regulations only one engine change is allowed without penalty. Additionally, Alex Davison missed a direction to have his car weighed on the scales at the end of the second leg qualifying which saw the Dick Johnson Racing Falcon excluded from the second leg of qualifying, relegating them to 20th grid position, which later became 19th after the exclusion of the Seton/Pretty Commodore.

Top 10 Shootout
The Top Ten Shootout was held on Saturday, 6 October 2007. Paul Radisich set the first time as the tenth qualifier at 2:08.4909. Lee Holdsworth undercut that time by three-tenths of a second with third car Steven Johnson improving the benchmark to 2:08.0782. Greg Murphy, Russell Ingall, James Courtney and Craig Lowndes all failed to improve on Johnson's time, with Ingall spinning off track at Murray's Corner. Garth Tander took almost eight-tenths off Johnson with Mark Skaife nudging a further tenth. Last car out, Mark Winterbottom drove a smooth clean lap and took pole position over Skaife by 0.1067 seconds.

Race
The race was held on Sunday, 7 October 2007. For the first time since 1978, the race did not start at 10am. Channel Seven, who were the new broadcasters of the race, chose to start the race at 10:30am to maximise the chance of a prime-time finish. The time would change again in 2019, when it was moved to 11:30am for a similar reason.

The race had not even started before it had its first retirement. Cameron McConville's car had an engine failure heading up Mountain Straight and he retired at Griffins Bend. The race was started, which after the field had passed McConville's car, the race director deemed the car was in an unsafe position and the safety car was deployed. The race resumed on Lap 4 and was without incident until Lap 52 when Andrew Jones's car caught fire at Forrests Elbow. He was able to drive the car safely to the gravel trap in The Chase and then marshals were able to extinguish the fire. The drivers resumed racing on Lap 53. Another safety car period did not occur until lap 91 when Marcus Marshall crashed the second Jack Daniel's Racing car. On Lap 102, Jack Perkins's car caught fire inside the car in the other Jack Daniel's Racing car. Perkins was able to drive the car into the pit lane and the fire was extinguished by the Britek Motorsport crew. On Lap 118, Dean Canto slid wide and crashed at Reid Park causing another safety car period.

Earlier the #1 Toll HSV Dealer Team car was retired with persistent brake fluid problems. At the time, this would have serious implications on the championship standings. Three laps later, the sister Toll HSV Dealer Team car retired with the same problem as the #1 car. Lap 134 saw the retirement of the #26 IRWIN Racing Britek Motorsport, Alan Gurr was at the wheel, crashed upon the restart. A lap later, Mark Noske retired with problems.

The final hour 
The race was considered to be an uneventful one until lap 142, when rain started to fall at different parts of the circuit, including Skyline, The Cutting and parts of Conrod Straight. Paul Morris spun the #67 Team Sirromet Wines into the wall at The Cutting, causing the safety car to be deployed. On Lap 148, rain was falling lightly on top of the mountain and five cars all fell victim to the wet conditions. Jason Bright, Russell Ingall, Mark Skaife and Shane van Gisbergen all crashed just before McPhillamy Park Corner, Van Gisbergen hitting the rear of Ingall's slowing car, causing the Team Kiwi Racing Falcon to pit. Ingall made it back to the pits, but Skaife and Bright ended up in the gravel trap. Just after the restart, Shane van Gisbergen spun at Murray's Corner. With only two laps remaining Race Control decided against deploying the safety car; instead telling crews to warn drivers.

Thirteen laps to go, Winterbottom continued to maintain the large lead that his teammate Richards built up throughout the race despite choosing to not change to wet tyres on the rain drenched track, until he ran off at The Chase, nearly rolling the car in the gravel trap, which relinquished his lead to Lowndes, with Johnson, Murphy and Courtney all passing him as a consequence. The incident damaged Winterbottom's steering, costing him a chance to podium as a result. The moment is considered to be one of the most iconic moments of Bathurst, with critics calling the incident "one of the biggest chokes in Bathurst history".

In the final laps, Craig Lowndes, Steven Johnson, Greg Murphy and James Courtney were fighting for the win. Johnson passed Lowndes and held the lead. Courtney passed Murphy for third and Simonsen (5th) attempted an outside pass up Mountain Straight, but did not pull it off. One lap later, Lowndes passed Johnson at Hell Corner, pushing them both slightly wide, allowing Courtney to get past Johnson for second. They stayed that way right up until the chequered flag. Lowndes had won his third Bathurst 1000, Whincup had won his second and Ford had won their second consecutive win. Greg Murphy was the best placed Holden, coming in fourth, after being passed by Courtney on Lap 148. It was also the first time that Ford swept the podium at Bathurst since 1988. The final hour was considered to be one of the best finishes in Bathurst 1000 history until 2014, when the race win was determined by a last lap pass.

Results

Qualifying

Top ten shootout

Starting grid
The following table represents the final starting grid for the race on Sunday:

The #14 suffered a terminal crash in qualifying leaving the grid at 30 entries.

Race results

Statistics
 Pole position - #6 Mark Winterbottom - 2:07.0908
 Fastest lap - #888 Jamie Whincup - 2:08.4651 (new lap record)
 Average Race Speed - 154 km/h
 7 Safety Car periods for a total of 13 Laps

References

External links
 Supercheap 1000 website 
 Official Race Results and Timing 
 Images at momentstosavour.com

Supercheap Auto Bathurst 1000
Motorsport in Bathurst, New South Wales